The 2010 CIS Women's Volleyball Championship was held March 5, 2010 to March 7, 2010, in Edmonton, Alberta, to determine a national champion for the 2009–10 CIS women's volleyball season. The tournament was played at the University of Alberta's Main Gym. It was the fifth time that the University of Alberta had hosted the tournament with the first four taking place over a five-year span from 1995 to 1999.

The top-seeded UBC Thunderbirds won their third consecutive national championship and completed an undefeated season following their victory over the Manitoba Bisons. The Thunderbirds finished the season with a 27–0 record against CIS opponents and became the fifth team to win three straight gold medals. This was the first time that UBC and Manitoba had faced each other in the gold medal match, with both programs entering the game having won six national championships. With the victory, the Thunderbirds tied a CIS record with their seventh championship win in program history, which had also been accomplished by the Winnipeg Wesmen and Alberta Pandas.

The 2009–10 Thunderbirds volleyball team was inducted into the UBC Sports Hall of Fame in 2017.

Participating teams

Championship bracket

Consolation bracket

Awards

Championship awards 
CIS Tournament MVP – Liz Cordonier, UBC
R.W. Pugh Fair Play Award – Sarah Létourneau-Lévesque, Laval

All-Star Team 
Ève Trepanier, Laval
Tricia Mayba, Manitoba
Jen Hinze, UBC
Ashley Voth, Manitoba
Liz Cordonier, UBC
Shanice Marcelle, UBC
Tiffany Proudfoot, Alberta

References

External links 
 Tournament Web Site

U Sports volleyball
2010 in women's volleyball
University of Alberta